Rufius Achilius Sividius ( 483–488) was a Roman senator under Odoacer's rule. His brothers included Rufius Achilius Maecius Placidus, and Anicius Acilius Aginantius Faustus.

Biography 
He is defined as "quaestor" (perhaps quaestor sacri palatii) in the inscription on his seat at the Colosseum. His consular diptych, which records his further career, has been preserved. After his term as quaestor, Sividius was appointed praefectus urbi of Rome and then patricius. In 488 he was consul posterior with Claudius Iulius Ecclesius Dynamius, both appointed by the court of Odoacer, and praefectus urbi for the second time.

Notes

Sources 
 "Rufius Achilius Sividius", Prosopography of the Later Roman Empire, Volume 2, Cambridge University Press, 1992, pp. 1017–1018.

5th-century Romans
5th-century Roman consuls
Acilii
Imperial Roman consuls
Patricii
Rufii
Urban prefects of Rome